Bartramia nothostricta is a species of mosses in the family Bertramiaceae and is endemic to the south-east of Australia. It grows in small colonies in moist places, and is recognised by its leaves which look like a shaving brush and by its bright green, spherical, lollipop-like capsules.

Description
The stems have a fairly large central strand and there are only a few, dark red-brown rhizoids at the base. The leaves are erect around the stem, standing like the hairs on a shaving brush.
The costa or "nerve" is strong, and more or less prominent on the lower side. The capsules are almost spherical, bright green and sit on top of a red stalk. The peristome has short yellowish teeth.

Taxonomy and naming
Bartramia nothostricta was first formally described in 1987 by David Catcheside and the description was published in Memoirs of the New York Botanic Garden. The specific epithet (nothostricta) is derived from the Ancient Greek word nothos meaning "spurious", "bastard" or "false"' and  the Latin word stricta meaning "straight" or "tight".

Distribution and habitat
This moss species occurs in the Flinders Ranges and Southern Lofty botanical regions of South Australia and in Victoria where it grows on earth banks and near streams.

References

External links

 David Catcheside, Biography of David Catcheside

nothostricta
Plants described in 1987
Bryophyta of Australia